Mount Hector is one of the highest peaks in the Tararua Range, situated in the lower North Island of New Zealand.

The peak is named after James Hector a leading scientist in New Zealand during the 19th century.

Mt Hector is the site of a memorial cross commemorating trampers killed in the Second World War.

References

Hector
Tararua Range